Ian Roberts (born on October 28, 1958, in Victoria, British Columbia) competed as a member of the Canadian Equestrian Team in eventing at the 2004 Summer Olympics. 

His farm is Dreamcrest Farms, in Port Perry, Ontario, which he owns with his wife, Kelly Plitz, also an Olympic eventing rider.

Roberts placed 23rd at the 2006 Rolex Kentucky Three Day Event, and 20th at the 2007 competition. He represented Canada at the 2006 FEI World Equestrian Games, but was eliminated in the individual competition.

Roberts is a graduate of Brentwood College School, located in Mill Bay, British Columbia.

References

External links
 Personal Farm Site
 Full list of competitions

Olympic equestrians of Canada
Equestrians at the 2004 Summer Olympics
Canadian male equestrians
1958 births
Living people
Sportspeople from Victoria, British Columbia